Bramatherium (Brahma’s beast) is an extinct genus of giraffids that ranged from India to Turkey in Asia. It is closely related to the larger Sivatherium.

Etymology
 
The first part of the generic name, Brahma (Sanskrit masculine , nominative  ), is in reference to the Hindu god of creation. The second part, "therium", comes from the Greek word θηρίον (transliterated therion), meaning 'beast'.

Description
Bramatherium was built very similarly to Sivatherium. Alive, it would have resembled a heavily built okapi and had a crown-like set of four, radiating ossicones. Fossils, and examination of teeth in particular, suggested the living animals dwelled woodlands and wetlands.

See also
 Hydaspitherium
 Vishnutherium

References

 Falconer, H. (1845) “Description of some fossil remains of Deinotherium, Giraffe, and other mammalia, from Perim Island, Gulf of Cambay, Western Coast of India”, J. Geol. Soc., 1, 356–372.

Pliocene extinctions
Pliocene even-toed ungulates
Prehistoric giraffes
Prehistoric even-toed ungulate genera
Miocene first appearances
Miocene mammals of Asia
Pliocene mammals of Asia
Fossil taxa described in 1845